Randy Haykin (born in Brooklyn, New York) is a serial entrepreneur, angel investor, venture capitalist and philanthropist who lives in the San Francisco Bay Area. Haykin founded and runs The Gratitude Network (www.gratitude-network.org), a 501c3 not-for-profit that provides coaching services to social entrepreneurs around the world.

Founded in 2012, The Gratitude Network is a global accelerator for social impact. Gratitude has worked with nearly 150 social entrepreneurs (both for-profit and not-for-profit) around the world (60+ countries) in a "scale-up" mode—they want to accelerate their growth and reach sustainability. Gratitude's programs include coaching, expert advising, an annual event (The Leadership Summit), and ongoing webinars on leadership. In 2021, Haykin was the national recipient of a silver Jefferson Award as a recognized community leader "Silicon Valley Venture Capitalist Teaches Others to Give With Gratitude"

In 1997, Haykin is a co-founded Outlook Ventures, which invested in over 30 growth-stage internet and software companies technology companies over a ten-year span. Haykin's "street training" came from executive roles at IBM, Apple, Paramount. Starting in 1993, Haykin joined a series of technology start-ups and held senior sales and marketing positions at Yahoo, Electric Minds and NetChannel.

Haykin has been an angel investor for more than 20 years, investing in more than 40 early stage companies, including early stakes in AOL, Yahoo, Voquette, eTeamz/Active, Sharie's Berries, Napo Pharmaceuticals, Solazyme, BiOar, EyeFluence, Table.co, FastPencil, LesConcierges, EnerAllies, CrowdOptic, Apploi, QASymphony, ePharmix, Sculptology, and ProQure.

Haykin and his wife are vintners/owners of Entrepreneur Wines www.entrepreneurwines.com, a wine brand producing chardonnays, pinot noirs and cabernets from exclusive Napa/Sonoma vineyards.

Haykin is a faculty member at the University of California, Berkeley Haas School of Business and visiting faculty of the University of Cambridge Judge Business School.

Haykin was Editor and writer of Demystifying Multimedia, published by Random House in 1992, and he co-wrote the book Fuel: Catholic Men, Loving the Faith; A Small Group Guide, which was released by Ave Maria Press in 2008.

Education 

He graduated in 1985 from Brown University, where he received a Bachelor of Arts degree in organizational behavior and management, and in 1988 from Harvard Graduate School of Business Administration, where he obtained his Masters in Business Administration.

Career 

Haykin was the founding vice president of marketing and sales at Yahoo!, where he was responsible for building the company's marketing team, establishing agency relationships and generating initial business model and advertising sales for Yahoo. Haykin was also vice president of marketing at NetChannel, which was acquired by America Online in 1998. He also served as part of the core team that launched America Online's Greenhouse, a venture incubator.

In his five years at Apple Computer, Haykin was responsible for creating and launching the Apple Multimedia Program for developers as well as a line of retail multimedia and CD-ROM products. He was also responsible for the division's strategic relations, including the creation of the "New Media Center" program for higher education, with 10 other manufacturers and publishers. As the director of operations and business development at Viacom/Paramount's West Coast operations (the "Media Kitchen"), Haykin was in charge of online services and interactive team-building, corporate strategy and marketing.

He is founder of The Gratitude Network and The Intersection Event, a day-long event on innovation and its effect on the social issues. In 1995, he formed Interactive Minds, which was renamed Outlook Ventures, a software venture capital company. In 1996, he cofounded Electric Minds, a social space on the Web for current topics.

The Harvard Business Review covered Haykin's career in a December 8, 1997 magazine article titled "Randy Haykin: The Making of an Entrepreneur."

Haykin is an advisor and board member at Reply Inc., Digital Chocolate, Embee Corp, LesConcierges, and CrowdOptic, Inc.

References

External links 
Outlook Ventures
Intersection Event
University of California, Berkeley faculty bio
Ave Maria Press book listing

American venture capitalists
Living people
Year of birth missing (living people)
Brown University alumni
Harvard Business School alumni
Haas School of Business faculty